Adelakun is both a surname and a given name of Yoruba origin, meaning "the king/crown/royalty opens the belly/womb". Notable people with the name include:

Abimbola Adelakun, Nigerian writer
Hakeeb Adelakun (born 1996), English footballer
Joseph Adebayo Adelakun (born 1949), Nigerian gospel singer, songwriter and televangelist
Adelakun Howells (1905–1963), Nigerian Anglican bishop
Femi Adelakun, Nigerian city planner and location intelligence expert